The 2018 FIBA Women's Polynesian Basketball Cup was an international basketball tournament contested by national teams of the newly formed Polynesia sub-zone of FIBA Oceania. The inaugural edition of the tournament was hosted by Samoa from 19 to 24 November 2018. Matches were played at the NUS Gymnasium.

The tournament serves as qualifiers for the basketball events of the 2019 Pacific Games in Samoa with three berths for Polynesia allocated for the top three teams,  excluding , in this tournament.

Teams 
 

 (Hosts)

 (withdrew)

Tonga withdrew from competition.

Preliminary round

Final round

Semi-finals

Third place game

Final

Final standings

Awards

 Most Valuable Player:  Keziah-Brittany Lewis

 All-Star Team:
 PG –  Aeata Tepu
 SG –  Cherish Manumaleuga
 SF –  Keziah-Brittany Lewis
 PF –  Oceane Lefranc
 C  –  Terai Sadler

See also 
 2017 FIBA Women's Melanesia Basketball Cup
 2018 FIBA Polynesia Basketball Cup (men's tournament)
 Basketball at the 2018 Micronesian Games
 Basketball at the 2019 Pacific Games

Notes

References

Polynesian Cup